The Fanteakwa constituency is in the Eastern region of Ghana. The current member of Parliament for the constituency is Kwabena Amankwah Asiamah. He was elected  on the ticket of the New Patriotic Party (NPP) and  won a majority of 5,246 votes more than candidate closest in the race, to win the constituency election to become the MP. He succeeded Kwadjo Agyei Addo who had represented the constituency in the 4th Republican parliament.

See also
List of Ghana Parliament constituencies

References

Parliamentary constituencies in the Eastern Region (Ghana)